The 2015–16 season was Feyenoord's 108th season of play, it marked its 60th season in the Eredivisie and its 94th consecutive season in the top flight of Dutch football. It was the first season with manager Giovanni van Bronckhorst, a former player who played seven seasons for Feyenoord and who played 106 times for Dutch national team. The club started the season relatively well alternating between the second and third place until the halfway point of the season. They then hit a seven-game losing streak among a nine-game stretch without a win and dropped to seventh place. They followed this up with a six-game winning streak to get back to the third position for the final stretch of the season. They ended the season third in the league. Feyenoord entered the KNVB Cup in the second round. They started their campaign by beating both finalist of the 2013–14 edition. They were coupled to past cup winners in all their cup matches and beat FC Utrecht 2–1 in the final. The cup win qualified them to the group stage of the 2016–17 UEFA Europa League.

Competitions

Overall

Source: Competitions

Eredivisie

League table

Results summary

League matches

Source: Royal Dutch Football Association

KNVB Cup

Friendlies

References

Feyenoord seasons
Feyenoord